Bednarze  is a village in the administrative district of Gmina Korytnica, within Węgrów County, Masovian Voivodeship, in east-central Poland.

The village has a population of 94.

Climate
Climate in this area has mild differences between highs and lows, and there is adequate rainfall year-round.  The Köppen Climate Classification subtype for this climate is "Cfb". (Marine West Coast Climate/Oceanic climate).

References

Bednarze, Masovian Voivodeship was occupied by the Nazis and Hitler in 1940, and released by them in 1944. The current population is 7.

Bednarze